Kathleen McCracken (born 1960 in Markdale, Ontario) is a Canadian poet, who was a shortlisted nominee for the Governor General's Award for English-language poetry at the 1992 Governor General's Awards for her collection Blue Light, Bay and College.

Her other collections have included Reflections (1978), Into Celebration (1980), The Constancy of Objects (1988), A Geography of Souls (2002), Mooncalves (2007), and Tattoo Land (2009), and her poetry has appeared in The Malahat Review, Poetry Canada Review, Exile Quarterly, Poetry Ireland, The Shop, Revival, Abridged, New Orleans Review and Grain.

She has lived in Northern Ireland since 1992, where she teaches English and creative writing at Ulster University.

References

1960 births
20th-century Canadian poets
21st-century Canadian poets
Canadian women poets
Canadian emigrants to the United Kingdom
People from Grey County
York University alumni
Academics of Ulster University
Living people
Canadian expatriate writers
21st-century Canadian women writers
20th-century Canadian women writers